Madina is an alternate spelling for Medina, the second holiest city in Islam.

Madina may also refer to:

Places
 Madina, Haryana, town in Rohtak district in the state of Haryana, India
 Al Madinah Province, Saudi Arabia 
 Madina, an alternate transliteration of Medina, Saudi Arabia
 Madina, Armenia
 Madina, Ghana, a town near the capital
 Madina, Mali, a commune and town
 Madina, Port Loko District, a locality in Sierra Leone
 Madina Colony (New Karachi Town), Union Council (U.C. # 7) of New Karachi Town, Karachi, Sindh, Pakistan
 Madina Colony (Orangi Town), Union Council (U.C. # 5) of Orangi Town, Karachi, Sindh, Pakistan
 Madina Town, a tehsil-level town of Faisalabad City within Faisalabad District, Punjab, Pakistan
 Al Madina (Abu Dhabi), neighborhood of Abu Dhabi, United Arab Emirates
 Al Madeena Islamic complex
 alternative name for the Wadajir District in Mogadishu, Somalia
 Mandailing Natal Regency, often Abbreviated Madina, a regency in North Sumatra

Media
 Al Madina (newspaper), an Arabic language newspaper published in Jeddah, Saudi Arabia
 Al-Madina (Israeli newspaper), an Israeli-Arabic local newspaper

People
 Madina Abilqasymova, Kazakh politician
 Madina Aliyeva, Azerbaijani ballerina
 Madina Memet, Chinese actress
 Madina Nalwanga, Ugandan actress
 Madina Sadvaqasova, Kazakh female singer

Sports
 Almadina S.C., a Libyan football club sometimes called Madina or Al Madina

See also 
 Medina (disambiguation)
 Madinah (disambiguation)